The Six Towns Times was a six-column, eight-page weekly newspaper focused on the news of six towns in southern Maine, United States. It was published on Fridays in Portland, Maine, by Libby & Smith, between 1892 and 1916. It reported the news of six towns: Cumberland, Freeport (where the newspaper was headquartered), Harpswell, North Yarmouth, Pownal and Yarmouth.

In its early days, the newspaper's title was Six Towns Times: Yarmouth Gazette and Freeport Sentinel.

The newspaper had a circulation of 900 during its peak years.

Its editor was Charles Thornton Libby (1861–1948). Yarmouth historian William Hutchinson Rowe called the publication a "lost but not forgotten institution."

References

External links 
Six Towns Times - Google News

Defunct newspapers published in Maine
Publications established in 1892
Publications disestablished in 1916
1892 establishments in Maine
Portland, Maine
Cumberland, Maine
Freeport, Maine
Harpswell, Maine
North Yarmouth, Maine
Pownal, Maine
Yarmouth, Maine